Highbridge Reservoir was a reservoir in the New York City water supply system, which received water from a portion of the Croton Aqueduct system. It was located on Amsterdam Avenue between 172nd Street and 174th Street, in Upper Manhattan adjacent to the High Bridge Water Tower and the High Bridge across the Harlem River Valley.

History
In 1863, the New York Legislature authorized construction of the reservoir and water tower to supply water pressure to buildings located at high elevations in the surrounding area. The project was designed by John B. Jervis, the chief engineer of the Croton Aqueduct. Construction began in 1866 and was completed in 1872.

By 1934, the reservoir had not been used for fifteen years and was proposed by New York State Office of Parks, Recreation and Historic Preservation Commissioner, Robert Moses, as the site of a new park. In the spring of 1934, Highbridge Reservoir was taken over by the Office of Parks for the construction of the Highbridge Play Center of Highbridge Park, including an outdoor swimming pool.

References
Notes

History of New York City
Cultural history of New York City
Reservoirs in New York (state)
Water infrastructure of New York City
Reservoirs in Manhattan